Speiser is a German and Yiddish surname. Notable people with the surname include:

Ambros Speiser (1922–2003), Swiss engineer and scientist
Andreas Speiser (1885–1970), Swiss mathematician
Elisabeth Speiser (born 1940), Swiss operatic soprano
Eliyahu Speiser (1930–2009), Israeli politician
Ephraim Avigdor Speiser (1902–1965), American Assyriologist
Felix Speiser (1880–1949), Swiss ethnologist
Jerry Speiser (born 1953), Australian drummer
Markus Speiser (born 1985), Austrian footballer
Paul Gustav Eduard Speiser (1877–1945), German entomologist
Paul Speiser (1846–1935), Swiss politician

See also

Speiser Shale, a geologic formation in Kansas, United States
Speiser v. Randall, a United States Supreme Court case

References

German-language surnames
Yiddish-language surnames